The New Town Hall (}) is the administrative centre of Prague's (medieval) New Town Quarter, or "Nové Město".  In 1419 it was the site of the first of the three defenestrations of Prague.

External links
 New Town Hall on Prague-wiki

Buildings and structures in Prague
City and town halls in the Czech Republic
Tourist attractions in Prague
National Cultural Monuments of the Czech Republic
Prague 2